The 1998–99 FIBA Saporta Cup was the thirty-third edition of FIBA's 2nd-tier level European-wide professional club basketball competition. It occurred between September 15, 1998, and April 13, 1999. The final was held at Zaragoza, Spain.

Competition system
 48 teams (national domestic cup champions, plus the best qualified teams from the most important European national domestic leagues), entered a preliminary group stage, divided into eight groups of six teams each, and played a round-robin. The final standings were based on individual wins and defeats. In the case of a tie between two or more teams, after the group stage, the following criteria were used to decide the final classification: 1) number of wins in one-to-one games between the teams; 2) basket average between the teams; 3) general basket average within the group.
 The top four teams from each group qualified for a 1/16 Final Playoff (X-pairings, home and away games), where the winners advanced further to 1/8 Finals, 1/4 Finals, and 1/2 Final.
 The Final was played at a predetermined venue.

Country ranking
For the 1998–1999 FIBA Saporta Cup, the countries are allocated places according to their place on the FIBA country rankings, which takes into account their performance in European competitions from 1995–96 to 1997–98.

Team allocation 
The labels in the parentheses show how each team qualified for the place of its starting round:

 1st, 2nd, 3rd, 4th, 5th, etc.: League position after eventual Playoffs
 CW: Cup winners
 WC: Wild card

Preliminary group stage

Round of 32

|}

Round of 16

|}

Quarterfinals

|}

Semifinals

|}

*The second leg which was scheduled to be played in Podgorica, was cancelled due to the war situation in Yugoslavia. Although FIBA accepted a neutral venue (Thessaloniki, Greece) to play this game, the Yugoslav players couldn't get out of their country because of the military conflict, and therefore FIBA definitely cancelled this match and awarded a forfeit (20–0) to Benetton Treviso.

Final
April 13, Pabellón Príncipe Felipe, Zaragoza

|}

Awards

FIBA Saporta Cup Finals MVP 
 Henry Williams ( Benetton Treviso)

See also 

 1998–99 FIBA Euroleague
 1998–99 FIBA Korać Cup

References
 1998–99 FIBA Saporta Cup @ FIBA Europe.com
 1998–99 FIBA Saporta Cup at Linguasport

Saporta
1998–99